The 14th World Sports Acrobatics Championships were held in Manchester, Great Britain, in 1997.

Men's Tumbling

Overall

Straight

Twisting

Men's Group

Overall

Balance

Tempo

Men's Pair

Overall

Balance

Tempo

Mixed Pair

Overall

Balance

Tempo

Women's Tumbling

Overall

Straight

Twisting

Women's Group

Overall

Balance

Tempo

Women's Pair

Overall

Balance

Tempo

References

Acrobatic Gymnastics Championships
Acrobatic Gymnastics World Championships
International gymnastics competitions hosted by the United Kingdom
1997 in English sport